Mrs. Fun is an acid jazz/free jazz duo composed of keyboard player Connie Grauer and drummer Kim Zick. Grauer and Zick are from Waukesha, Wisconsin, but recorded Mrs. Fun's first album in Nashville, where they met the Indigo Girls. They then returned to Wisconsin, moving to Milwaukee. Their most recent album, Funsville, and their 1999 "best of" album appear on Daemon Records, while their previous records were released on their own FunTime Records.

Discography
Lulu's Walk (1987)
They Are Not A Trio (1991)
No Ennui (1995)
Groove (1998)
ChristMrs. Fun (1999)
The Best Of Mrs. Fun (1999)
Funsville (2000)
Truth (2018)

External links
Official Web Site

Mrs. Fun
Musical groups from Wisconsin
Daemon Records artists